Anatol Richter (born 21 July 1970) is an Austrian fencer. He competed in the foil events at the 1988 and 1992 Summer Olympics.

References

External links
 

1970 births
Living people
Austrian male foil fencers
Olympic fencers of Austria
Fencers at the 1988 Summer Olympics
Fencers at the 1992 Summer Olympics
Fencers from Vienna